The Brunei Investment Agency (BIA) is a government-owned corporation that reports to the Ministry of Finance of the Government of Brunei. Established in 1983, its offices are located in Bandar Seri Begawan at the Ministry of Finance HQ. Data on the agency's assets are not reported to the public and the Sultan and his assets, to a certain degree, are also incorporated in the agency; however the extent is unknown.

Legal status
Prior to Brunei's independence, the country's investment portfolio was administered by the British Crown. The BIA was established under an Act of the Government of Brunei and became functional from 1 July 1983.

The objective defined under the Act is to hold and manage the General Reserve Fund of the Government and all its external assets. The agency manages 40% of Brunei's foreign reserves, remainder being managed by eight foreign organizations.

The Sultan of Brunei and Yang de Pertuan have the authority to specify any other issues that need to be addressed by BIA.

Functions
The agency's principal tasks are to control and manage Brunei's general reserve funds and the growth of external holdings. It manages the country's income from oil exports in the form of foreign reserves.

Its managing director, Dato Abdul Rahman Karim, is also a Permanent Secretary in the Finance Ministry. BIA mostly functions as the central bank in the country and has a strong financial base with funds generated from the country's gas and oil resources, apart from Worker's Provident Fund and other revenues.

Investments

Some major foreign assets of BIA include the Dorchester Collection, which is a portfolio of luxury hotels established in 1996; a 10% holding in the Paterson Securities of Australia, and Bahagia Investment Corporation (Malaysia), dealing with real estate.

BIA's investment portfolio, apart from investments within Brunei, covers diverse investments in bonds, equity, currency, gold and real estate. It has substantial investments in the US.

Brunei investors bought The Dorchester on Park Lane in London in 1985 for US$50 million and in 1996 BIA formed the Dorchester Collection, a conglomerate of luxury hotels in UK, United States, France and Italy. BIA also owns The Beverly Hills Hotel in Los Angeles which was bought for US$185 million in 1987 as well as the Grand Hyatt Singapore Hotel. BIA also has a 10% holding in the Paterson Securities of Australia, and Bahagia Investment Corporation of Malaysia, dealing with real estate.

In June 2018 BIA acquired a stake in Molten Ventures for £20 million.

References

External links
Official website

Banks of Brunei
Financial regulatory authorities
Government-owned companies of Brunei
Investment Agency
Bandar Seri Begawan
Financial services companies established in 1983
1983 establishments in Brunei
Government agencies of Brunei
Sovereign wealth funds